Briarwood is a historic home located at Charleston, West Virginia.  It was designed
in the 1920s by English-born architect Fred Crowthers for Dr. Rhuell Hampton Merrill, the minister of the Kanawha Presbyterian Church from 1898 to 1907.  The English Tudor style home features varying roof lines and asymmetrical massing.

It was listed on the National Register of Historic Places in 1984 as part of the South Hills Multiple Resource Area.

References

Houses in Charleston, West Virginia
Houses completed in 1922
Houses on the National Register of Historic Places in West Virginia
Tudor Revival architecture in West Virginia
National Register of Historic Places in Charleston, West Virginia